"Captain Cook", or "Plan A: Captain Cook", is the first episode of Blackadder Goes Forth, the fourth series of the BBC sitcom Blackadder.

Plot
Blackadder and Baldrick are discussing the latter's latest feeble cunning plan: namely, Baldrick carving his name on a bullet to get around the fact that "there's a bullet with [his] name on it". Lt. George enters and provides Blackadder with a copy of the propaganda magazine King and Country, which Blackadder uses for toilet paper, and a new service revolver. Blackadder deduces from these ominous signs that an advance against the Germans is imminent, one which they will probably not survive. Baldrick suggests that they take up cooking at HQ to get out of the assault but Blackadder shoots down the idea, highlighting Baldrick's extremely poor cooking skills: among other delicacies, his "cream custard" is actually cat's vomit.

Shortly afterwards, Blackadder is called to the office of General Melchett for a special mission: Field Marshal Haig's supreme tactical plan (where the men climb out of their trenches and walk slowly towards the enemy, a plan they have used eighteen times before) is weakening the men's morale and he is in search of a way to raise their spirits. After Blackadder jokingly suggests Haig's resignation and suicide (which Melchett takes literally and notes down), he is told that they need new inspiring artwork for the front cover of King and Country. Blackadder is uninterested until he learns that the artist needs to leave the trenches for Paris, and attempts to paint a work of art by himself. He and Baldrick both fail, but when George reveals he can paint surprisingly well, Blackadder gets him to paint a picture of a British soldier (resembling Blackadder) standing next to the body of a dead nun in a ruined French village.

When Melchett and Captain Darling arrive to inspect their work, Blackadder displays his own painting "War" in place of George's. The General rejects it; George tries to protest, but he and Baldrick are only to speak when given permission by Blackadder, which the Captain refuses to grant. The next painting, Baldrick's "My Family and Other Animals", depicts vomit and is also rejected by Melchett. Blackadder proceeds to take credit for George's painting, earning himself the position of war artist.

Melchett then reveals that the King and Country cover story was just a ploy: instead of Paris, the chosen artist will in fact go into No-Man's Land and draw the enemy positions. With debatable help from George and Baldrick, he returns with a sketch illustrating immense but fictional enemy defensive capabilities, including a large number of elephants. Darling and Blackadder suggest that the push should be cancelled. Melchett responds by saying that would be exactly what the enemy would expect and therefore what they will not do, in order to make the Germans think that the British intelligence is rotten. Melchett orders the attack anyway, which Blackadder, George and Baldrick avoid by dressing up as Italian chefs and substituting themselves for Melchett's chef. After serving Baldrick's vile cuisine to Melchett and Darling, the three escape back to the trenches, where Blackadder asks Baldrick how he managed "to get so much custard out of such a small cat".

External links
 
 

Blackadder episodes
1989 British television episodes
Television shows written by Ben Elton
Cultural depictions of Douglas Haig, 1st Earl Haig
Television shows written by Richard Curtis